Elections to Wiltshire County Council were held on Thursday, 7 May 1981, following boundary changes to the county's electoral divisions.  The whole council of seventy-four members was up for election and the result was that the Conservatives retained their control, winning forty seats. Labour ended with twenty county councillors, the Liberals twelve, and Independents two, including one Ratepayer.

Election result

|}

References

External links
Colin Rallings, Michael Thrasher, Wiltshire County Council election Results 1973–2005 at electionscentre.co.uk

1981
1981 English local elections
20th century in Wiltshire